Stachlerkopf is a mountain in Liechtenstein in the Rätikon range of the Eastern Alps, close to the towns of Steg and Malbun, with a height of .

References
 
 

Mountains of the Alps
Mountains of Liechtenstein